Leonidas Dixon Coates Jr.   was a rear admiral in the United States Navy. He was a 1926 graduate of Oakland Technical High School in Oakland, California, and went on to the United States Naval Academy. 
Named director of the Navy's Guided Missile Division in 1951, Deputy Chief of Naval Research in 1954, Assistant Chief of the Bureau of Aeronautics in 1957, and became Chief of Naval Research from February 1961 to 1964.

References

Further reading
"Navy Chief Will Speak Here". Oakland Tribune news story. 23 October 1963. Page 44.

United States Navy rear admirals